Dibenzofuran is a heterocyclic organic compound with the chemical structure shown at right. It is an aromatic compound that has two benzene rings fused to a central furan ring. All the numbered carbon atoms have a hydrogen atom bonded to each of them. It is a volatile white solid that is soluble in nonpolar organic solvents.  It is obtained from coal tar, where it exists as a 1% component.

Reactions
Dibenzofuran is thermally robust with a convenient liquid range. These properties, together with its low toxicity, are exploited by the use of DBF as a heat transfer agent.

It undergoes electrophilic reactions, such as halogenation and Friedel-Crafts reactions.  Reaction of DBF with butyl lithium results in dilithiation.

Dibenzofuran is the precursor to the drug furobufen by Friedel-Crafts reaction with succinic anhydride.

Safety
Dibenzofuran is a relatively non-toxic compound as evidenced by rats being unaffected after a 200-day diet consisting of 0.025 – 0.4% of DBF.  The polychlorinated dibenzofurans are however among the potentially toxic dioxins and dioxin-like compounds.

Dibenzofuran is cited in the United States Clean Air Act 1990 Amendments -Hazardous Air Pollutants as a volatile hazardous air pollutant of potential concern. The Superfund Amendment Reauthorization Act (SARA) Section 110 placed dibenzofuran on the revised Agency for Toxic Substances and Disease Registry (ATSDR) priority list of hazardous substances to be the subject of a toxicological profile. The listing was based on the substance’s frequency of occurrence at Comprehensive Environmental Response, Compensation, and Liability Act (CERCLA) National Priorities List sites, its toxicity, and/or its potential for human exposure.

See also
 Benzofuran

References

 
Diphenyl ethers